The Sabrina Way is a waymarked long-distance footpath and bridleway in England.

Development
The Sabrina Way was developed by Brenda Wickham for the British Horse Society and local partner authorities, and was created in 2000. It is named after Sabrina, river goddess of the Severn.

Distance

The route
The route is primarily designed and intended for horses and riders and links bridleways between the Pennines and the Cotswolds and The Ridgeway.

It runs north–south between Hartington in the Derbyshire Peak District and Great Barrington.

It passes from Derbyshire where it leaves the Pennine Bridleway (and bridleway networks that run north to Cumbria) through Staffordshire heading south through Weston Park and the Wyre Forest in Worcestershire to enter Gloucestershire, Wiltshire and Oxfordshire.

It does encompass some tarmac road riding but is mainly on bridleways and paths.

Connecting trails

The Sabrina Way links with the Claude Duval Bridleroute, Cotswold Way, Diamond Way (North Cotswold), Geopark Way, Gloucestershire Way, Jack Mytton Way, Macmillan Way (Boston to Abbotsbury), Manifold Way, Millennium Way, Monarch's Way, Pennine Bridleway, Severn Way, Staffordshire Moorlands Challenge Walk, Staffordshire Way, Teme Valley Way, Three Rivers Ride, Tissington Trail, Two Saints Way, White Peak Rollercoaster, Windrush Way and the Worcestershire Way.

References

External links
 Sabrina Way - LDWA Long Distance Paths
 Ride-UK The National Bridleroute Network
 Horse Magazine News item
 The Peak District info on the Sabrina Way
 Daily Telegraph feature on the route from 2003

Long-distance footpaths in England
Bridleroutes in the United Kingdom
Footpaths in Derbyshire
Footpaths in Gloucestershire
Footpaths in Staffordshire
Footpaths in Worcestershire
Footpaths in Wiltshire
Footpaths in Oxfordshire